Tacuru is a Brazilian City in the Midwest region, located in the state of Mato Grosso do Sul. It has, besides Portuguese, Guarani as its official language.

References

Municipalities in Mato Grosso do Sul